NGC 5486 is an irregular galaxy in the constellation Ursa Major 110 million light-years from Earth.

The galaxy is considered a member of the NGC 5485 group (LGG 373).

It was discovered on 2 May 1785 by William Herschel with an 18.7-inch reflecting telescope, who described it as "F, cL" (faint, considerably large) in his catalogues of nebulae.

External Links

References 

Irregular galaxies
Astronomical objects discovered in 1785